Istiblennius meleagris, the peacock rockskipper, is a species of combtooth blenny found in coral reefs in the western Pacific ocean. It is also known as the white-speckled blenny. Males can reach a maximum of  TL, while females can reach a maximum of  SL.

References

meleagris
Fish described in 1836